Viviania elegans is a flowering plant species in the family Francoaceae.

References

External links
 Original description (in Spanish) in Biodiversity Heritage Library

Francoaceae
Plants described in 1896